Borj Nord or Burj al-Shamal, Al-Burj ash-Shamali is a fort in the city of Fez, Morocco. It was first established in 1582 by the Saadi dynasty, modeled after the Portuguese forts in the 16th century. It is among the largest defense structures around the city of Fez and one of the few to incorporate European-style changes in military architecture in the gunpowder age. Today, the fort is open to public as the Museum of Arms.

Historical background of the fort 

The fort was built in 1582 by the powerful Saadi sultan Ahmad al-Mansour. The Saadians, whose capital was Marrakesh, had faced notable resistance to their rule in Fez and the fort is one of several that they built around the city. They were intended to keep the restless population of Fes el-Bali (the old city) under control as much as to actually defend the city from external attacks. Accordingly, the forts were built in commanding positions overlooking the city, from which their canons could easily bombard the city if desired. Along with Borj Nord, the other forts built at this time were: Borj Sud, facing Borj Nord across the valley on a hilltop overlooking Fez from the south; Kasbah Tamdert, a citadel guarding Bab Ftouh to the south-east; and the Borj Sheikh Ahmed, one of three bastions built along the east and south walls of Fes el-Jdid and the one closest to Fes el-Bali. The Saadians built Borj Nord, Borj Sud, and the new bastions of Fes el-Jdid to emulate Portuguese military architecture; a consequence of their wars to oust the Portuguese from Morocco. Their construction was probably helped by the labour and expertise of European prisoners captured in the famous Battle of the Three Kings in 1578. These are the first and arguably only fortresses in Fez designed for the new age of gunpowder.

The large corner bastions of the fort (giving it a star-like appearance from above) are believed to have been added later during the Alaouite period. The original fort would have been more compact and almost cubic in appearance, similar to the Borj Sud which still retains its original form.

Museum of Arms

Today the fort houses the Museum of Arms (French: Musée des armes). Founded in 1963, it was the first museum in Morocco specializing in the history of arms and armour. Its collection includes up to 5000 pieces (only a part of which are on display) originating from 35 countries and dating from prehistory to the 20th century. The museum emphasizes the collection of Moroccan arms, and features a large number that were manufactured in Fez in the Makina, an industrial arms factory established in 1886 next to the Royal Palace in Fez. One of the notable artifacts on display is an enormous Saadian cannon that was used during the Battle of Three Kings in 1578, nearly 5 meters long and weighing around 12 tons.

The building, the museum and its collection were extensively restored in 2003.

References

Forts in Morocco
Buildings and structures in Fez, Morocco
16th-century fortifications
Star forts

Saadian architecture